Events from the year 1935 in Taiwan, Empire of Japan.

Incumbents

Central government of Japan
 Prime Minister: Keisuke Okada

Taiwan
 Governor-General – Nakagawa Kenzō

Events

April
 21 April – The magnitude 7.1 Shinchiku-Taichū earthquake struck western Taiwan

October
 10 October – The Taiwan Exposition: In Commemoration of the First Forty Years of Colonial Rule opens

November
 28 November – The Taiwan Exposition: In Commemoration of the First Forty Years of Colonial Rule closes

Births
 5 May – Shih Chi-yang, Minister of Mainland Affairs Council (1991)
 13 June – Chai Trong-rong, member of Legislative Yuan (1993–1996, 1997–2012)
 20 July – Joseph Kuo, film director

References

 
1930s in Taiwan
Years of the 20th century in Taiwan